Streptomyces puniciscabiei is a streptomycete bacterium species known to cause potato common scab disease in Korea. Its type strain is S77T (=LMG 21391T =KACC 20253T). It has purple-red, spiny spores that are borne in simple rectus flexuous spore-chains.

References

Further reading

KHODAKARAMIAN, GHOLAM, DOOST MORAD ZAFARI, and PARI MOHAMMAD JAVAD SOLEIMANI. "DIVERSITY OF STREPTOMYCES STRAINS CAUSING POTATO SCAB DISEASE IN HAMEDAN PROVINCE AND THEIR THAXTOMIN PRODUCTION POTENTIAL." APPLIED ENTOMOLOGY AND PHYTOPATHOLOGY (2011).

External links

LPSN

puniciscabiei